The Jugurthine War (112–106 BC) was an armed conflict between the Roman Republic and king Jugurtha of Numidia, a kingdom on the north African coast approximating to modern Algeria. Jugurtha was the nephew and adopted son of Micipsa, king of Numidia, whom he succeeded on the throne, overcoming his rivals through assassination, war, and bribery.

The war constituted an important phase in the Roman subjugation of Northern Africa, and the rise of the empire, but Numidia did not become a Roman province until 46 BC. Following Jugurtha's usurpation of the throne of Numidia, a loyal ally of Rome since the Punic Wars, Rome felt compelled to intervene.

Jugurtha and Numidia

Numidia was a kingdom located in North Africa (roughly corresponding to northern modern day Algeria) adjacent to what had been Rome's arch enemy, Carthage. King Masinissa, who was a steadfast ally of Rome in the Third Punic War, died in 149, and was succeeded by his son Micipsa, who ruled 149–118 BC. At the time of his death Micipsa had three potential heirs: his two sons, Adherbal and Hiempsal I, and an illegitimate nephew, Jugurtha. Jugurtha had fought under Scipio Aemilianus at the siege of Numantia, where, through friendship with Roman aristocrats, he had formed an acquaintance with Roman manners and military tactics. Micipsa, worried that at his death Jugurtha would usurp the kingdom from his own somewhat less able sons, adopted him, and bequeathed the kingship jointly to his two sons and Jugurtha. After King Micipsa's death the three kings fell out, and ultimately agreed between themselves to divide their inheritance into three separate kingdoms; however, they were unable to agree on the terms of division, and Jugurtha declared open war on his cousins; Hiempsal, who, though the younger, was the braver of the brothers, was assassinated by Jugurtha's agents, and Adherbal, unable to defend himself, was defeated and forced to flee to Rome, where he appealed for arbitration to the Roman Senate.

Although the Senate were securities for Micipsa's will, they now allowed themselves to be bribed by Jugurtha into overlooking his crimes, and organized a commission, led by the ex-Consul Lucius Opimius, to fairly divide Numidia between the remaining contestants (116 BC). However, Jugurtha bribed the Roman officials in the commission into allotting him the better, more fertile and populous western half of Numidia, while Adherbal received the east. Powerless against Roman corruption, Adherbal accepted and peace was made. Shortly after, in 113 BC, Jugurtha again declared war on his cousin, and defeated him, forcing him to retreat into Cirta, Adherbal's capital. Adherbal held out for some months, aided by a large number of Roman Equites who had settled in Africa for commercial purposes. From inside his siege lines, Adherbal appealed again to Rome, and the Senate dispatched a message to Jugurtha to desist. The latter ignored the demand, and the Senate sent a second commission, this time headed by Marcus Scaurus, a respected member of the aristocracy, to threaten the Numidian king into submission. The king, pretending to be open to discussion, protracted negotiations with Scaurus long enough for Cirta to run out of provisions and hope of relief. When Scaurus left without having forced Jugurtha to a commitment, Adherbal surrendered. Jugurtha promptly had him executed, along with the Romans who had joined in the defence of Cirta. But the deaths of Roman citizens caused an immediate furor among the commoners at home, and the Senate, threatened by the popular tribune Gaius Memmius, finally declared war on Jugurtha in 111 BC, though with reluctance.

Bestia
Lucius Calpurnius Bestia, consul for the year, was appointed to command the Roman army in Africa against Jugurtha; he was accompanied by Scaurus and other experienced officers and received an offer of alliance from Bocchus, king of Mauretania. The defection of Bocchus, his own father-in-law, filled Jugurtha with alarm, and he sent to the Roman consul to surrender. Whereupon the Roman senators, no longer looking on him as a threat, allowed themselves to be bribed into granting him a treaty on extremely lenient terms; Numidia was restored to Jugurtha intact, and a small fine and the remittal of his war-elephants (which he later bought back at reduced price from corrupt officers), was the only price he was forced to pay for his crimes. In fact, so favourable were Jugurtha's terms of surrender that it led to a renewal of the popular outcry at Rome; at the demand of the tribune Memmius, an investigation was launched into the proceedings of the treaty. Jugurtha was summoned to Rome – with the promise of a safe-conduct – and appeared as a witness; but, rather than complying with the inquisition, bribed two Roman Tribunes to veto the proceedings and prevent him from testifying. In the ensuing outrage, Jugurtha's cousin Massiva, who had fled to Rome in fear of his cousin, seized the opportunity to press his own claim to the Numidian throne. Jugurtha assassinated him, and the Senate, though initially inclined to accept bribery again to allow him to escape retribution, was ultimately compelled by his insolence and by the fury of the mob to expel him from the city and revoke the recent peace.

Spurius, Aulus Postumius
The consul Spurius Postumius Albinus took command of the Roman army in Africa (110 BC), but failed to carry out energetic action, due to incompetence, indiscipline in his army, and – it was alleged – bribery by Jugurtha. Later in the year Albinus returned to Italy, leaving the command to his brother, Aulus Postumius Albinus. The latter, more active though no more able than his brother, decided on a bold stroke, marching in mid-winter to besiege the town of Suthul, where the Numidian treasury was kept; however, the town was strongly garrisoned and excellently fortified and could not be captured. Postumius, anxious not to have retreated without striking the enemy a blow, allowed Jugurtha to lure him into the desolate wilds of the Sahara, where the cunning Numidian king, who had reportedly bribed Roman officers to facilitate his attack, was able to catch the Romans at a disadvantage. Half the Roman army was killed, and the survivors were forced to pass under the yoke in a disgraceful symbolism of surrender. The beaten Postumius signed a treaty resigning Numidia to Jugurtha and returning to the peace concluded with Bestia and Scaurus. The Senate, however, when it heard of this capitulation, refused to honour the conditions and continued the war.

Metellus
After Postumius' defeat, the Senate finally shook itself from its lethargy, appointing as commander in Africa the plebeian noble Quintus Metellus, who had a reputation for integrity and courage. Metellus proved the soundness of his judgement by selecting as officers for the campaign men of ability rather than of rank, as the former tribune Gaius Marius (a plebeian from Arpinum) and the noted disciplinarian and military theorist Publius Rutilius Rufus.  When Metellus arrived in Africa in 109 BC, he first had to retrain the army and institute some form of discipline.
In spring of 109, Metellus led his reorganised army into Numidia; Jugurtha was alarmed and attempted negotiation, but Metellus prevaricated; and, without granting Jugurtha terms, he conspired with Jugurtha's envoys to capture Jugurtha and deliver him to the Romans. The crafty Jugurtha, guessing Metellus' intentions, broke up negotiation and retreated, withdrew south beyond the Numidian mountains and took up position on the plains behind.
Metellus followed and crossed the mountains into the desert, advancing to the river Muthul. Jugurtha had divided his army into two detachments, one of which (composed of cavalry and the best of his infantry) lay south of the mountain on the right flank of the Romans, who were marching to the river Muthul, which lay parallel to the mountains, 18 miles to the south; the second lay further south, closer to the river (formed of war-elephants and the rest of the infantry).
Metellus handled the situation by sending one force directly south to the river under Rufus while the rest under Metellus and Marius marched obliquely south-west to dislodge Jugurtha from his position and prevent him from hindering the march of the first body to the river. Jugurtha, however, displaying excellent generalship, dispatched a column of infantry to hold the mountain passes as soon as the Romans had descended into the plain, thus cutting off their line of retreat; while his cavalry harried Metellus' detachment of infantry in swarms along the plain – to which the Romans were unable to properly respond, since they had no cavalry themselves. Meanwhile, Rufus had advanced to the river but was attacked by Jugurtha's southern force; thus, the two Roman armies were incapable of coming to each other's relief. However, although Metellus' army was now entrapped in the desert with fewer troops and inferior generalship, the Romans still prevailed simultaneously on both fronts. Rufus overpowered the southern detachment by a forward charge, sending the elephants and infantry of the enemy flying across the desert; while Metellus and Marius, rallying a group of legionaries, charged to occupy the single hill on the plain, which commanded the situation. The inferior Numidian soldiers of Jugurtha were powerless before the advance of Roman infantry and scattered into the desert with severe losses. Metellus had won the Battle of the Muthul, but since the Numidian king had escaped the war was far from over.

After this defeat a fresh round of negotiations ensued between Jugurtha and the Roman commander. Although Jugurtha offered heavy concessions, they were ultimately unsuccessful because Metellus believed the war could only end with the capture of Jugurtha, who refused to become a prisoner. To resist the Romans more effectually, Jugurtha dismissed most of his low-quality recruits, keeping only the most active troops of infantry and light cavalry, in order to maintain the war by guerrilla tactics. Metellus advanced once again, capturing town after town, but was unable to capture his enemy. He tried to provoke Jugurtha into a pitched battle by besieging the Numidian city of Zama, but the king refused to let himself be goaded and kept up his irregular warfare tactics. In 108 BC, when Metellus found out the location of Jugurtha's army, he caught up with the Numidians and inflicted a serious defeated on the king. Jugurtha, with his family and treasure boxes, fled to the desert fortress of Thala, which was inaccessible except by an excruciating march of three days through the desert without water. Metellus furnished his army with skins for water transport and followed to besiege the fortress, which fell after forty days. However, Jugurtha managed to escape from the flaming wreckage, undoing all of Metellus' efforts.

At this point Jugurtha retired to the court of his father-in-law, king Bocchus I of Mauretania, who though previously professing friendship for the Romans, now received Jugurtha hospitably, and, without positively declaring war (on Rome), advanced with his troops into Numidia as far as Cirta, the capital. Metellus, who had taken up winter quarters in the area after the conclusion of the campaign, began negotiation with Bocchus to hand over Jugurtha. But before an agreement could be reached, Metellus was deposed from his command by the Roman Tribal Assembly and replaced by his lieutenant, Gaius Marius. An internal struggle in the Roman camp between Metellus and Marius led to this change of command. Metellus looked unfavourably on Marius's known ambitions in Roman politics and refused for days to allow him to sail to Rome and stand for the consulship. Eventually, Metellus permitted Marius to return to Rome and Marius was elected consul in 107. Metellus was, however, unaware that Marius wanted his command in Numidia. Numidia was not an area designated to be assigned to a consul by the Roman Senate. However, the populares passed a law in its Tribal Assembly which gave the command against Jugurtha to Marius in 107. This was significant because the Assembly usurped the Senate's rights and powers in this matter and the Senate yielded.

Metellus was furious at all these developments and decided to make Marius's command a lot more difficult by refusing his legions to serve under Marius. He [Metellus] sent them back to Italy to join the army of the other consul, Lucius Cassius Longinus, who was about to march north to confront a Germanic invasion of Gaul.

Marius

Marius found Rome's traditional manpower reserves depleted. As inequality increased, fewer men of military age met the property requirements to serve in the legions. Yet, thousands of poor Italians, the Capite Censi or Head Count, sat idly in Rome, ineligible to serve. Seeking to use them, and with precedent for waiving the property requirements during the existential crisis that was the Second Punic War, Marius was exempted from the requirements. These events would inspire Marius into reforming the Roman army.

When Gaius Marius arrived in Numidia as consul in 107 BC he immediately ceased negotiation and resumed the war. Marius marched west plundering the Numidian countryside, seizing minor Numidian towns and fortresses trying to provoke Jugurtha into a set-piece battle, but the Numidian king refused to engage. Marius' strategy was similar to Metellus', and yielded no better results; he continued the occupation of Numidian towns and he fortified several strategic positions. At the end of 107 BC Marius made a dangerous desert march to Capsa in the far south where, after the town surrendered, he executed all survivors. Next he advanced far to the west, capturing a fortress near the river Muluccha where Jugurtha had moved a large part of his treasure. Meanwhile, Jugurtha’s loyalists had recaptured Cirta. By marching so far to the west Marius had brought the Roman army very near to the dominions of king Bocchus finally provoking the Mauretanian into direct war; and, in the deserts just west of Serif, Marius was taken by surprise by a massive army of Numidians and Mauretanians under command of the two enemy kings. For once, Marius was unprepared for action and in the melee all he could do was form defensive circles. The attack was pressed by Gaetulian and Mauretanian cavalries and for a time Marius and his main force found themselves besieged on a hill, while Marius's quaestor Lucius Cornelius Sulla and his men were on the defensive on another hill nearby. However, the Romans managed to hold off the enemy until evening and the Africans retired confident of finishing the job the next morning. The Romans surprised the Africans' insufficiently guarded camp the next morning at dawn and completely routed the African army. They then marched east to take Cirta again and go into winter quarters there. The African kings harried the march east with light cavalry, but were beaten back by Sulla whom Marius had put in command of the rearguard and the cavalry. The combined African army then tried to finish off Marius, but when Sulla returned from his pursuit the Romans routed both Jugurtha’s and Bocchus’s army. Marius had won the Second Battle of Cirta and could now put his army into winter quarters. Marius's army thus finished the year's campaigns in safety at Cirta, but it was by now evident that Rome could not defeat Jugurtha's guerrilla tactics through war. Over the winter, therefore, Marius resumed negotiations with Bocchus, who, though he had joined in the fighting, had not yet declared war. Ultimately, Marius reached a deal with Bocchus whereby Sulla, who was friendly with members of Bocchus's court, would enter Bocchus's camp to receive Jugurtha as a hostage. In spite of the possibility of treachery on the Mauritanian's part, Sulla agreed; Jugurtha's remaining followers were treacherously massacred, and he himself handed over in chains to Sulla by Bocchus. In the aftermath, Bocchus annexed the western part of Jugurtha's kingdom, and was made a friend of the Roman people. Jugurtha was thrown into an underground prison (the Tullianum) in Rome, and ultimately died after gracing Marius's triumph in 104 BC.

Revelations

The Jugurthine War clearly revealed the problems of the Republic at that time and to come. The fact that a man such as Jugurtha could rise to power by buying Roman military and civil officials reflected Rome's moral and ethical decline. Romans now sought individual power often at the expense of the state. This was illustrated by Marius's rise to power by ignoring Roman traditions. These events were also observed by Marius's quaestor, Lucius Cornelius Sulla, who later came to rival Marius in the first of the great civil wars of the Late Republic. The beginning of that rivalry, according to Plutarch, was purportedly Sulla's crucial role in the negotiations for and eventual capture of Jugurtha, which led to Sulla wearing a ring portraying the capture despite Marius being awarded the victory for it.

The Roman historian Sallust wrote a monograph, Bellum Jugurthinum, on the Jugurthine War emphasising this decline of Roman ethics and placed it, along with his work on the Catilinarian Conspiracy, in the timeline of the degeneration of Rome that began with the Fall of Carthage and ended with the Fall of the Roman Republic itself. Sallust is one of the most valuable sources on the war, along with Plutarch's biographies of Sulla and Marius.

References

External links
Sallust's Conspiracy of Catiline and The Jurgurthine War at Project Gutenberg in plain text form.
 

110s BC conflicts
100s BC conflicts
2nd century BC in the Roman Republic
Kingdom of Numidia
Military history of Algeria
Ancient Algeria
Wars involving the Roman Republic
Wars of succession involving the states and peoples of Africa